Abdullah Al-Ahrak (born 10 May 1997) is a Qatari footballer who plays as midfielder for Al-Duhail and Qatar national football team.

International career
Al-Ahrak made his international debut for Qatar on September 5, 2017 during a 2018 FIFA World Cup qualification match against China.

International goals
Scores and results Qatar's goal tally first.

Honours

Club
Al Duhail SC
Qatar Stars League: 2017–18, 2019–20
Qatar Emir Cup: 2018, 2019
Qatar Cup: 2018 Qatar Cup

International
Qatar
2014 AFC U-19 Championship

References

1997 births
Living people
Qatari footballers
Aspire Academy (Qatar) players
Al-Duhail SC players
Al Ahli SC (Doha) players
Qatar Stars League players
Cultural Leonesa footballers
Segunda División B players
2019 Copa América players
2021 CONCACAF Gold Cup players
Qatar international footballers
Qatari expatriate footballers
Expatriate footballers in Spain
Qatari expatriate sportspeople in Spain
Qatar youth international footballers
Association football midfielders